Suzhou Trips Football Club is a former Chinese football club based in Suzhou, Jiangsu who played in the Suzhou City Stadium. Founded in January, 2004 the club entered at the bottom of the Chinese football league pyramid where they stayed throughout their entire existence. The club brought in former Asian Footballer of the Year winner Fan Zhiyi as their technical director to raise their profile and performances of the club, however this ended up being highly disruptive and caused the club to get into debt. In their hopes to win promotion they would merge with another third-tier club Zhenjiang Groupway FC and then this would following with another merging with Ningbo Huaao football club at the beginning of the 2010 league season.

Results
As of the end of 2009 season

All-Time League rankings

:  in group stage

See also
Zhenjiang Groupway FC
Ningbo Huaao

References

External links
 https://web.archive.org/web/20070325044951/http://www.sztripsfootball.com/

Football clubs in China
Sport in Jiangsu
Defunct football clubs in China
Association football clubs established in 2004
Association football clubs disestablished in 2009
2004 establishments in China
2009 disestablishments in China